Phonetic alphabet can mean:

 Phonetic transcription system: a system for transcribing the precise sounds of human speech into writing
 International Phonetic Alphabet (IPA): the most widespread such system
 (See :Category:Phonetic alphabets for other phonetic transcription systems)
Phonemic orthography: an orthography that represents the sounds of a particular language in such a way that one symbol corresponds to each speech sound and vice versa
 Spelling alphabet  radio alphabet: a set of code words for the names of the letters of an alphabet, used in noisy conditions such as radio communication; each word typically stands for its own initial letter
 NATO phonetic alphabet: the international standard (e.g., Alfa, Bravo, Charlie, Delta etc.)
 (See :Category:Spelling alphabets for other radio-telephony spelling alphabets)